Cooper Lake, located near Lake Hill in the Town of Woodstock, Ulster County, New York, is the largest natural lake in the Catskill Mountains. However, it has been expanded somewhat over the years since it serves as the main reservoir for the nearby City of Kingston and Town of Ulster, which stores water there that it pipes from Mink Hollow Stream in addition to the water that reaches the lake from its 8.6-square mile (22.4 km²) drainage basin.

Swimming and fishing in Cooper Lake are prohibited.

The area of Cooper Lake and the surrounding grounds is owned by City of Kingston Water Department.

References

Lakes of Ulster County, New York
Woodstock, New York
Reservoirs in New York (state)
Lakes of New York (state)